Wilder is the second album by neo-psychedelic Liverpool band The Teardrop Explodes, and the final completed album released by the group.

In 2000 former Teardrop Explodes leader Julian Cope gave his blessings to re-release Wilder with a selection of bonus tracks, mainly single b-sides, plus original artwork, a remastered sound, and full lyrics and essays.

Background

Wilder was recorded following a turbulent period in the band's career involving the success of their debut album Kilimanjaro,  several line-up changes and a fraught, drug-fuelled American tour. For Wilder, the group's leader and principal songwriter Julian Cope developed his songwriting by using many experimental approaches.

Wilder featured a far greater use of synthesizer arrangements and loop experiments than Kilimanjaro, predominantly at the instigation of keyboard player David Balfe (who acted as Cope's principal creative collaborator in the studio). By now Cope had mostly abandoned his role as the group's bass player (with many tracks on the record featuring session bassist James Eller) and shared some of the guitarist role with Troy Tate, as well as dabbling in piano and organ. Some tracks featured a full group sound as featured on Kilimanjaro (most notably "Passionate Friend", the only single release and album track to feature the band's ill-fated US touring members Alfie Agius and Jeff Hammer) but in general the album broke away from the West Coast/beat group sound of the debut as well as having a noticeably more downbeat and troubled atmosphere. Some Wilder tracks featured little or no guitar, avoided the standard drumkit or set Cope's voice against solo synthesizer only.

While these approaches resulted in an album of diverse styles and revealed that The Teardrop Explodes was a far more flexible band than previous releases had suggested, it also lost the group many of the fans of the more straightforward Kilimanjaro.  Although the single "Passionate Friend" charted reasonably, the album failed commercially. The band released one further EP, "You Disappear From View", which was added to the 2000 reissue of Wilder (following a previous release on Everybody Wants To Shag ... The Teardrop Explodes, the band's posthumous release of post-Wilder demos and late tracks).

Track listing

Original track listing (1981)

CD Re-issue bonus tracks (2000)

CD Re-issue bonus disc (2013)

Personnel
The Teardrop Explodes
Julian Cope - vocals, guitars, bass guitar, piano, organ
Troy Tate - guitars
David Balfe - keyboards, synthesizers, loops (except on "Passionate Friend")
Gary Dwyer - drums
with:
Alfie Agius - bass guitar on "Passionate Friend" 
Jeff Hammer - keyboards on "Passionate Friend" 
James Eller - bass guitar
Luke Tunney, Ted Emmett - trumpets
Clive Langer - additional guitar
Garrish Mashindi - backing vocals on "Like Leila Khaled Said"
Technical
Colin Fairley - engineer
Martin Atkins - artwork
Chalkie Davies - photography

Charts

Certifications

References

1981 albums
The Teardrop Explodes albums
Albums produced by Clive Langer
Fontana Records albums